Wołomin  is the main town of Wołomin County situated in the Masovian Voivodship.

In the 1990s and 2000s, the town was synonymous with the "Wołomin gang", one of two major organised crime groups in the country.

History

Wołomin was first mentioned in chronicles from the 15th century. It remained a small village in central Masovia without much significance. Since 19th century, and especially after the foundation of the railway in 1862, Wołomin became a summer holiday destination for Warsaw citizens. The Wołomin glassworks were founded in the beginning of the 20th century.

Wołomin was declared a town in 1919 after the return of Poland's sovereignty. In 1920 the Polish counter-attack in the Battle of Warsaw was conducted near Wołomin. In the interbellum Wołomin retained its status as a multinational town. There was a big Jewish and Russian minority. Polish writer Zofia Nałkowska had a house in Wołomin, which became an inspiration for her 1925 book House over meadows.

World War II
At the beginning of the War, Wołomin was bombed by the German Air Force. In Wołomin there were no big fights on land, but there were regular air fights between German and Polish planes from the airport in Zielonka. 157 soldiers from Wołomin participated in the war against the Germans. A large proportion were killed, the rest of them were taken prisoner. German forces occupied Wołomin on September 14, 1939. A number of activists of pre-war Polish social organizations were sent to concentration camps by Germans.

A resistance movement was created in Wołomin based on scouts and national organizations. Eventually, the Wołomin conspiracy was subordinated to the Narodowe Siły Zbrojne organization. 

During World War II, the Jews of Wołomin were forced into a ghetto set up by Nazi German administration on 15 November 1940, along the railway line between the streets of Kobyłka, Wspólna, Wiejska, Glinka and Cementowa. The ghetto inmates numbered about 2,700 people including Jews expelled from other locations. The Judenrat was established in the building at 17 Nałkowskiego Street. Deportations aboard Holocaust trains to Treblinka extermination camp began on 19 August 1942. The ghetto was liquidated on 6 October 1942. A few hundred people (416-620 according to different sources) were shot in the ghetto, including many elderly and sick people. Their bodies were buried in a mass grave near the J. Korsaka Road. Some Jews were deported to the Warsaw Ghetto as slave labour and exterminated during the Grossaktion Warsaw.

In 1944 a substantial battle was fought near the town between the Soviet armoured units and German 39th Panzer Corps. Soviet losses were high and the Red Army was forced to retreat. Most of the Russian minority escaped westwards before the arrival of the Red Army.

Postwar history
After the war, Wołomin became a capital of the powiat of Wołomin and started to grow rapidly. The window assembly plant was founded and Wołomin soon became a suburb of Warsaw. Even today most of the town's inhabitants commute to Warsaw on a daily basis.

After 1989 Wołomin's glassworks were temporarily closed during the recession. However, the technology of production of temperature resistant glass, invented in the facility, allowed the factory to continue production and recover under new ownership.

Sports 
BS Wołomin is a professional women's basketball team, they play in the Basket League.

Crime 
The most well known of the Polish organised crime groups in the 1990s was the so-called "Wołomin gang" and their arch-nemesis' the "Pruszków gang", with whom they fought bloody turf wars. Eventually the groups were finally crushed by the Polish police in cooperation with the German police in a spectacular raid on the A2 motorway between Konin and Poznań in September 2011.

International relations

Twin towns — Sister cities
Wołomin is twinned with:
 Salerno, Italy

References

External links

 Wolomin County page
 City Council (Polish)
 Jewish Community in Wołomin on Virtual Shtetl
 

Cities and towns in Masovian Voivodeship
Wołomin County
Warsaw Voivodeship (1919–1939)
Holocaust locations in Poland